Garegin Nzhdeh Square, formerly Souren Spandaryan Square, is the second largest square in the city of Yerevan, Armenia. It is located in the Shengavit district, to the south of the city centre. The square is intersected by the following streets: Garegin Nzhdeh, Manandian, Yeghbayrutian and Bagratuniats. The square was officially opened on 30 April 1959.

The statue of the Bolshevik leader Suren Spandaryan is erected in the square since 1990. The square was renamed after the Armenian National Hero Garegin Nzhdeh on 25 May 1991.

The metro station of Garegin Nzhdeh Square and the "Metro Theatre" hall are located underground the square.

Gallery

References

External links
 Live cam at Garegin Nezhdeh Square

Buildings and structures in Yerevan
Tourist attractions in Yerevan
Squares in Yerevan